"Expresso Love" is a song written by Dire Straits frontman Mark Knopfler for their third album Making Movies. It is one of their heavier songs, with a distorted guitar playing the main riff, which was recycled from the unreleased track "Making Movies". It also has a keyboard melody played throughout the piece, with the melody altering slightly at points. It is basically a love song. "Expresso Love" also contains a reference to the earlier Dire Straits song "Wild West End" from their eponymous album, with the line "Hey mister, you wanna take a walk in the wild west end sometime?"

It was one of the four songs from the Making Movies album to be performed throughout the Love Over Gold and Brothers in Arms tours, with a particularly notable version on the live album Alchemy, but the song was dropped from the lineup afterwards. It was also a radio single in the United States, reaching #39 on the US Mainstream Rock chart.

In 1984, the live version from Alchemy was released as a single backed with the Alchemy edition of "Two Young Lovers", and the song was later re-released in CD format as one of the B-sides to the single "The Bug".

References

1980 songs
Dire Straits songs
Songs written by Mark Knopfler
Song recordings produced by Mark Knopfler
Song recordings produced by Jimmy Iovine